The 1982 Donnay Indoor Championships was a men's tennis tournament played on indoor carpet courts in Brussels in Belgium the event was part of the 1982 Volvo Grand Prix. It was the second edition of the tournament and was held from 8 March through 14 March 1982. Third-seeded Vitas Gerulaitis won the singles title.

Finals

Singles

 Vitas Gerulaitis defeated  Mats Wilander, 4–6, 7–6, 6–2
 It was Gerulaitis' 1st singles title of the year and the 20th of his career.

Doubles

 Pavel Složil /  Sherwood Stewart defeated  Tracy Delatte /  Chris Dunk, 6–4, 6–7, 7–5

References

Donnay Indoor Championships
Donnay
+